Abryna regispetri is a species of beetle in the family Cerambycidae found in Eastern Asian countries like Cambodia, China, Laos, Malaysia, Myanmar and Thailand.

References

Beetles described in 1860
Beetles of Asia
Pteropliini